Cambuskenneth is a village in the city of Stirling, Scotland. It has a population of 250 and is the site of the historic Cambuskenneth Abbey. It is situated by the River Forth and the only road access to the village is along Ladysneuk Road from Alloa Road in Causewayhead. In 1935 a footbridge was constructed across the river to the neighbouring district of Riverside. Prior to then, the access to Stirling was by ferry.

The village is on the site of an old orchard. The village public house, the Abbey Inn was on the corner of North Street and closed in 2016. Beside the footbridge is the village hall, which is the meeting place for the community council, and across from that the park, which has a children's play area and a small football pitch.

References

External links

Clan Stirling - Cambuskenneth
Scottish Archives for Schools - The Statute of Cambuskenneth, issued by the Scottish Parliament, 6 November 1314

Villages in Stirling (council area)
Stirling (city)